Chaa Creek is a tributary of the Macal River in the Cayo District in western Belize.  One of the official gauging stations of the Macal is located near the confluence with Chaa Creek.  

There are Maya ruins that remain largely unexcavated in the Chaa Creek catchment basin; certain early research was conducted on the archaeology at Chaa Creek in 1997 by Harvard University. Significant pottery finds and other artifacts have been recovered at the Chaa Creek site, which is posited to be a satellite site of Xunantunich.

The Chaa Creek Nature Reserve is a noted area for birdwatching. Over 300 species of birds have been sighted there.

The underlying geology of this watershed can be characterised as limestone associations of foothills of the Maya Mountains.

See also
Cahal Pech - another Maya site in the vicinity
The Lodge at Chaa Creek - an eco-resort and 365 acre private nature reserve located in the Cayo District of Belize, Central America.

References

Cayo District
Macal River
Maya sites in Belize
Rivers of Belize